Iris lutescens, the Crimean iris, is a rhizomatous flowering plant in the genus Iris. It is native to North East Spain, Southern France and Italy. It is found on rocky or sandy hillsides or in woodlands.

It prefers full sun, a slightly acid soil, and dry conditions during its dormant period in the summer.

This plant is cultivated as an ornamental plant in temperate regions. In the UK it has gained the Royal Horticultural Society's Award of Garden Merit.

References

lutescens
Flora of Spain
Flora of France
Flora of Italy
Garden plants of Europe
Plants described in 1789